In Search for Khnum, a novel by writer and Egyptologist Hussein Bassir, is the first book with a Pharaonic setting among contemporary Egyptian literature in the style of ‘90s generation’. It is arguably the first work of his own literary style and also his first experiment in regenerating the Pharaonic inspiration for modern Egyptian belles-lettres following the innovations of Naguib Mahfouz that were published in the first half of the twentieth century.

This novel was published at the start of 1998 by the Egyptian organization of the Department of Culture. The reception which it received from readers and critics since its appearance has meant that it became out of print in record time.

Plot summary
The events of the novel take place in Ancient Egypt and in particular during the transitional period after the New Kingdom, towards the start of the Third Intermediate Period, during the 21st Dynasty (c. 1070-945 BC). At this time, Egypt was ruled by the High Priests of the god Amun-Ra, who dwelt in the traditional capital Thebes, which was also known as Waset in ancient times, and is known today as Luxor. This period is known as one of theocratic rule, due to the religious nature of the governments’ authority. Among historians, this is considered one of the rare times when ancient Egypt was directly controlled by the high priests. There was also a civil government who very probably had family ties with Pharaoh Ramses XI (c. 1099-1069 BC), the last king of the last dynasty of the New Kingdom (c. 1539-1070 BC), also known as the Imperial age or (by Egyptologists) as the 20th Dynasty (1186-1069 BC).

With the end of the so-called New Kingdom, Egypt lost much of the power, prestige and domination that she had enjoyed earlier. Beyond her borders, the holdings of her empire had diminished, and within the country there was anarchy for a variety of causes. The most important was the split in government between the north and the south. The north was managed by Smendes, the governor of Tanis, a town in the eastern Delta, while the south was managed by the High Priest of Amun-Ra, Herihor, resident at Thebes. The events of the Tale of Wenamun are a good example of the decline in Egyptian possessions as defined by territories and states that characterized this period. In his tale Wenamun leaves the temple of Amun-Re at Thebes to acquire wood from the eastern coastal region of the Mediterranean which had previously been under Egyptian control for several centuries, in order to build a sacred bark for this god. During the dangerous journey the hero of this tale, Wenamun, experiences numerous difficulties: he is driven from one of the towns he visits and is once even threatened with death. All of these unfortunate events show how serious the situation of Egypt is at this time. The events of In Search of Khnum take place in this historical context. In a narrative framework, the author describes an imaginary situation that takes place in precisely this period of Ancient Egyptian history. It is thus not a real or even an experienced history, as was the case with the Pharaonic writings of the very great novelist Naguib Mahfouz: Khufu's Wisdom, Rhadopis of Nubia, Thebes at War, Before the Throne, Akhenaten: Dweller in Truth.

In consequence this story takes place in ancient Egypt to reconstruct the reality and to observe it rather than reproducing it. At the same time, this novel is not only concerned with past time, but also reflects a diaphanous shadow on the present with a skillful literary talent. It is a novel that is as engaged with the present as it is associated with the past and with the fundamental aim of declaring itself optimistic for the future. What is truly remarkable about this literary work is its surprising capacity to reconstruct the Egyptian past and dwell on its details without bombarding the reader with subjects and historical events, and without compromising the truth of this distant period. Thus the history of Ancient Egypt is presented in such a literary and artistic manner that it confirms art's true role and incredible capacity in preserving and reanimating cultural heritage. The author also knows how to renew and refashion this heritage in an engaging style which allows the observer to view it with a fresh eye, and both to enrich his thoughts about life and to deepen his knowledge of literature. It is not an easy matter to create a setting similar to the ambiance of the period's chronicles, and this is what gives this work its originality and brilliance. The author's style gives the novel its splendor to the novel, since he is a specialist in Egyptology and has a passion to make this science both his career and the subject of his writing.

:fr:À la recherche de Khnoum

Egyptian novels
1998 novels
Novels set in ancient Egypt
Arabic-language novels
Novels set in the 11th century BC
Novels set in the 10th century BC